Hexis is a term used in Aristotelian philosophy.

Hexis may also refer to:

 Hexis S.A., a French manufacturer of self-adhesive vinyl (PVC) films
 Hexis Racing, a French auto racing team
 Hexis, formerly part of the enterprise security company Sensage

See also
 Hexisea, a flower of the family of orchids